NGC 134 is a barred spiral galaxy that resembles the Milky Way with its spiral arms loosely wrapped around a bright, bar-shaped central region. Its loosely bound spiral arms categorize it as Hubble-type Sbc. It is 60million light years away, and part of the Sculptor constellation.

The VLT image of the galaxy (shown right) reveals the following. A prominent feature of NGC134 is its warped disc, i.e., when viewed sideways it does not appear flat. A trail of gas is stripped from the top edge of the disc. Together, these features suggest that it interacted with another galaxy, but that remains unproven. The galaxy has an abundance of ionized hydrogen regions along its spiral arms where stars are forming. These regions appear red in the picture. It also has many dark lanes of dust that occlude its complete starlight.

The discovery of NGC134 is often attributed to Sir John Herschel at the Cape of Good Hope, but he did note that it might have been the 590th object discovered by James Dunlop in his 1828 publication, six years prior to Herschel's own observations. O'Meara has suggested NGC 134 might be named as the Giant Squid Galaxy.

Supernova 2009gj in NGC134 was discovered in 2009 by the amateur astronomer Stuart Parker in New Zealand.

References

External links
 

Barred spiral galaxies
Interacting galaxies
0134
001851
Sculptor (constellation)